RJAF may refer to:
 Royal Jordanian Air Force
 Matsumoto Airport (ICAO airport code RJAF)